Timable is an online event listing platform in Hong Kong, consisting of websites and mobile apps, co-founded by Sam Yuen and Mike Ko in 2010. It displays popular events happening in the city, including concerts, dramas, exhibitions, festivals, events for family, etc. The name refers to its attempt to create a platform that allows users to search by time. Users can search for events, matching their spare time.

Timable, an original word, means "able to time" according to the explanation on its website. The letter "e" is omitted in the word based on common English grammar, like "scalable", "writable". The name is often misspelled as "timeable" or "timetable". At the moment, there is no corresponding Chinese name for Timable.

Listings are contributed by event organizers in Web 2.0 approach, or published by Timable Editors. By the end of 2013, over 23,000 events have been recorded.

History
 2010-07-11: Launch of Facebook page
 2010-07-14: Official launch of Timable.com
 2010-09: Launch of mobile website
 2011–12: Joined Cyberport incubation programme
 2012-04: Timable co-operates with Yahoo! Hong Kong and launches "Timable on Yahoo!"
 2012-08-31: Release of iPhone ios app
 2013-10-13: Release of Android app

Awards
 2010: Awarded Cyberport Creative Micro Fund (CCMF)
 2011: 2011 Top 10 .hk Website Competition – Merit Prize in SME Group
 2013-04-08: Hong Kong ICT Awards 2013 – Best Mobile Apps (Mobile Marketing) Silver Award

Media coverage
2011-03-03: Article by Samson Tam – published on local newspaper Sing Tao Daily and website hksilicon.com
 2012-01-29: Interview by Asia Television (www.hkatv.com)
 2012-06-06: Interview by One Media Trading Express
 2012-10-22: Interview by STHeadline
 2013-03-25: Report by TVB Weekly
 2013-08-05: Interview by Apple Daily
 2013-08-07: Interview by Hong Kong Economic Times
 2013-11-14: Report by STHeadline
 2013-12-27: Interview by i-CABLE News Channel

References

External links
 Main website

Web services